The Sorcerer's Apprentice is a children's reality show that originally aired on BBC One with Barney Harwood as host for the first series from 9 to 20 July 2007, it was moved to BBC Two with Ortis Deley as host for series two and three from 25 January to 20 December 2009.

Transmissions

External links
 
 

2007 British television series debuts
2009 British television series endings
2000s British children's television series
BBC children's television shows
British reality television series
English-language television shows
Television series by Warner Bros. Television Studios